Palmetto Island State Park is a recent addition to the Louisiana State Park system. The new state park is located south of Abbeville, Louisiana in Vermilion Parish. The state of Louisiana acquired the property for the park in 1981 but did not begin construction on it with the intent of public use until 2002. State budget constraints and other concerns delayed the park's opening until October 28, 2010.

The park,  in size, is noted for its abundance of palmettos,(mostly Dwarf Palmetto) which form a dense understory in the coastal bottomland hardwood forest that predominates here.
Palmetto Island State Park has a visitor's center which houses a multi-purpose room that can rented for meetings, weddings and other social events. A water playground is located nearby. Guests may stay at one of six two-bedroom cabins nestled in the woods or use any of the park's 95 campsites. There are four picnic pavilions and strategically placed picnic sites for visitors. An aquatic pavilion overlooks the Vermilion River. Access to the Vermilion River is provided by a boat launch. Interior lagoons allow canoers and kayakers the opportunity to observe native animal and plant life. Including a new population of Iris nelsonii.
A nature trail (of 0.75 miles) begins at the park's visitor center.

The park address is 19501 Pleasant Road, Abbeville, LA 70510.

References

External links
Louisiana Department of Culture, Recreation and Tourism

State parks of Louisiana
Protected areas established in 2010
Protected areas of Vermilion Parish, Louisiana
Islands of Louisiana
Landforms of Vermilion Parish, Louisiana